The Kyiv Ukraine Temple is the 134th operating temple of the Church of Jesus Christ of Latter-day Saints (LDS Church). Located in Kyiv, the capital of Ukraine, it is the 11th temple of the LDS Church in Europe, the first located within the territory of the former Soviet Union, and the second in Eastern Europe (the Freiberg Germany Temple, dedicated in 1985 in the former German Democratic Republic, was the first).

History
Announced in 1998, the temple was open to the public for a two-week open house from 7–21 August 2010. The temple was dedicated on 29 August 2010 by church president Thomas S. Monson.

The plans to build a temple in Ukraine were announced by the LDS Church on 20 July 1998. However, the project was delayed for nine years as the church encountered difficulty in obtaining the three to four hectares of land it wanted for the project. On 23 June 2007, ground was broken for the construction project by Paul B. Pieper, who was then the first counselor in the presidency of the church's Europe East Area.

In 2020, the Kyiv Ukraine Temple was closed in response to the coronavirus pandemic. In February 2022, the temple was closed, due to Russia's invasion of Ukraine, but reopened on October 16 of the same year.

See also

 Comparison of temples of The Church of Jesus Christ of Latter-day Saints
 List of temples of The Church of Jesus Christ of Latter-day Saints
 List of temples of The Church of Jesus Christ of Latter-day Saints by geographic region
 Temple architecture (Latter-day Saints)
 The Church of Jesus Christ of Latter-day Saints in Ukraine

References

External links

 Kyiv Ukraine Temple Official site
 Kyiv Ukraine Temple at ChurchofJesusChristTemples.org

21st-century Latter Day Saint temples
Religious buildings and structures in Kyiv
Religious buildings and structures completed in 2010
Temples (LDS Church) in Europe
The Church of Jesus Christ of Latter-day Saints in Ukraine